Poyntington is a village and civil parish in the county of Dorset in South West England. In the 2011 census the parish had a population of 128.

Poyntington shares a grouped parish council, Yeohead & Castleton Parish Council, with the three village parishes of Castleton, Goathill and Oborne. Historically the village was part of the hundred of Horethorne in neighbouring Somerset.

All Saints' Church has grown from an Anglo-Saxon two-room design and contains original Norman work. Murals on pillars were discovered in 1848 but were destroyed by their exposure. Two stained-glass windows date from the fourteenth century. An unusual addition is a carving of an angel's wing which was blown off Amiens Cathedral in World War I and then donated to the church.

Notable residents
Sir Thomas Malet, Judge
William Launcelot Scott Fleming
Sir Ralph Cheyne (d.1400)

References

External links

Villages in Dorset
Places formerly in Somerset
Civil parishes in Dorset